The Mi Notebook Air is a portable computer introduced in 2016 by Xiaomi Corporation. There are two versions of the computer, which differ in screen size (12.5-inch and 13.5-inch) and some other hardware elements. The first 12.5-inch generation used an Intel Core M3-6Y30 microprocessor, which was later upgraded to an Intel Core m3-7Y30 microprocessor. Both models feature a 1080p screen with a back-lit keyboard.

Specifications

Operating system
The Xiaomi Mi Notebook Air is configured with an OEM activated Windows 10 operating system. It supports the most recent Linux distributions, as demonstrated by the Deepin Linux Team.

Processor
The Mi Laptop Air 13.3" version comes pre-installed with the Intel® Core™ i5 processor and the 12.5" version comes with the Intel® Core™ M3 processor.

Motherboard
The motherboard installed in the Xiaomi Mi Notebook Air is manufactured by Timi Personal Computing Co. Ltd.

Power management
The Mi Laptop Air uses a 7.4V/5000mAh 37Wh battery.

References

External links
Xiaomi Airdots

Netbooks
Xiaomi